The Club of Rome is a nonprofit, informal organization of intellectuals and business leaders whose goal is a critical discussion of pressing global issues. The Club of Rome was founded in 1968 at Accademia dei Lincei in Rome, Italy. It consists of one hundred full members selected from current and former heads of state and government, UN administrators, high-level politicians and government officials, diplomats, scientists, economists, and business leaders from around the globe. It stimulated considerable public attention in 1972 with the first report to the Club of Rome, The Limits to Growth. Since 1 July 2008, the organization has been based in Winterthur, Switzerland.

History

Formation 
The Club of Rome was founded in April 1968 by Aurelio Peccei, an Italian industrialist, and Alexander King, Director-General for Scientific Affairs at the OECD. It was formed when a small international group of people from the fields of academia, civil society, diplomacy, and industry met at Villa Farnesina in Rome, hence the name.

The problématique 
Central to the formation of the club was Peccei's concept of the problematic. It was his opinion that viewing the problems of humankind—environmental deterioration, poverty, endemic ill-health, urban blight, criminality—individually, in isolation or as "problems capable of being solved in their own terms", was doomed to failure. All are interrelated. "It is this generalized meta-problem (or meta-system of problems) which we have called and shall continue to call the "problematic" that inheres in our situation."

In 1970, Peccei's vision was laid out in a document written by Hasan Özbekhan, Erich Jantsch, and Alexander Christakis. Entitled, The Predicament of Mankind; Quest for Structured Responses to Growing Worldwide Complexities and Uncertainties: A PROPOSAL. The document would serve as the roadmap for the LTG project.

The Limits to Growth 
The Club of Rome stimulated considerable public attention with the first report to the club, The Limits to Growth. Published in 1972, its computer simulations suggested that economic growth could not continue indefinitely because of resource depletion. The 1973 oil crisis increased public concern about this problem. The report went on to sell 30 million copies in more than 30 languages, making it the best-selling environmental book in history.

Even before The Limits to Growth was published, Eduard Pestel and Mihajlo Mesarovic of Case Western Reserve University had begun work on a far more elaborate model (it distinguished ten world regions and involved 200,000 equations compared with 1,000 in the Meadows model). The research had the full support of the club and its final publication, Mankind at the Turning Point was accepted as the official "second report" to the Club of Rome in 1974. In addition to providing a more refined regional breakdown, Pestel and Mesarovic had succeeded in integrating social as well as technical data. The second report revised the scenarios of the original Limits to Growth and gave a more optimistic prognosis for the future of the environment, noting that many of the factors involved were within human control and therefore that environmental and economic catastrophe were preventable or avoidable.

In 1991, the club published The First Global Revolution. It analyses the problems of humanity, calling these collectively or in essence the "problematique". It notes that, historically, social or political unity has commonly been motivated by enemies in common: "The need for enemies seems to be a common historical factor. Some states have striven to overcome domestic failure and internal contradictions by blaming external enemies. The ploy of finding a scapegoat is as old as mankind itself—when things become too difficult at home, divert attention to adventure abroad. Bring the divided nation together to face an outside enemy, either a real one, or else one invented for the purpose. With the disappearance of the traditional enemy, the temptation is to use religious or ethnic minorities as scapegoats, especially those whose differences from the majority are disturbing." "Every state has been so used to classifying its neighbours as friend or foe, that the sudden absence of traditional adversaries has left governments and public opinion with a great void to fill. New enemies have to be identified, new strategies imagined, and new weapons devised."

"In searching for a common enemy against whom we can unite, we came up with the idea that pollution, the threat of global warming, water shortages, famine and the like, would fit the bill. In their totality and their interactions these phenomena do constitute a common threat which must be confronted by everyone together. But in designating these dangers as the enemy, we fall into the trap, which we have already warned readers about, namely mistaking symptoms for causes. All these dangers are caused by human intervention in natural processes, and it is only through changed attitudes and behaviour that they can be overcome. The real enemy then is humanity itself."

In 2001 the Club of Rome established a think tank, called tt30, consisting of about 30 men and women, ages 25–35. It aimed to identify and solve problems in the world, from the perspective of youth.

A study by Graham Turner of the research organisation CSIRO in Australia in 2008 found that "30 years of historical data compare favorably with key features of a business-as-usual scenario called the "standard run" scenario, which results in collapse of the global system midway through the 21st century."

In 2008, the club moved its headquarters from Hamburg to Winterthur in Switzerland.

Organization 
According to its website, the Club of Rome is composed of "scientists, economists, businessmen, international high civil servants, heads of state and former heads of state from all five continents who are convinced that the future of humankind is not determined once and for all and that each human being can contribute to the improvement of our societies."

The Club of Rome is a membership organization and has different membership categories. Full members engage in the research activities, projects, and contribute to decision-making processes during the club's annual general assembly. Of the full members, 12 are elected to form the executive committee, which sets the general direction and the agenda. Of the executive committee, two are elected as co-presidents and two as vice-presidents. The secretary-general is elected from the members of the executive committee. The secretary-general is responsible for the day-to-day operation of the club from its headquarters in Winterthur, Switzerland. Aside from full members there are associate members, who participate in research and projects, but have no vote in the general assembly. The club has a satellite office in Brussels.

The club also has honorary members. Notable honorary members include Princess Beatrix of the Netherlands, Orio Giarini, Fernando Henrique Cardoso, Mikhail Gorbachev, King Juan Carlos I of Spain, Horst Köhler, and Manmohan Singh.

The annual general assembly of 2016 took place in Berlin on 10–11 November. Among the guest speakers were former German President Christian Wulff, German Minister for Economic Cooperation and Development Gerd Müller, as well as Nobel Laureate Muhammad Yunus.

National associations
The club has national associations in 35 countries and territories. The mission of the national associations is to spread the ideas and vision in their respective countries, to offer solutions and to lobby for a more sustainable and just economy in their nations, and to support the international secretariat of the club with the organization of events, such as the annual general assembly.

Current activities
 there have been 43 reports to the club. These are internally reviewed studies commissioned by the executive committee, or suggested by a member or group of members, or by outside individuals and institutions. The most recent as of 2018 is Come On! Capitalism, Short-termism, Population and the Destruction of the Planet.

In 2016, the club initiated a new youth project called "Reclaim Economics". With this project they support students, activists, intellectuals, artists, video-makers, teachers, professors and others to "shift the teaching of economics away from the mathematical pseudo-science it has become."

On 14 March 2019, the Club of Rome issued an official statement in support of Greta Thunberg and the school strikes for climate, urging governments across the world to respond to this call for action and cut global carbon emissions.

In 2020, the Earth4All initiative was launched at the UNFCCC Race-to-Zero Dialogues session on Transformational Leadership to explore potential transformational political and economic solutions for the 21st century. Led by the Club of Rome, the BI Norwegian Business School and the Potsdam Institute for Climate Impact Research, a group of researchers and policymakers assessed global risks and identified five pathways to catalyze transformation and systemic change towards sustainability: energy, food, poverty, inequality and population (including health and education). The results are published in the book "Earth for All" in 2022 alongside the 50th anniversary of the first Earth Summit in Stockholm and the initial publication of the Limits to Growth in 1972.

Critics

Economist Robert Solow, recipient of a Nobel Memorial Prize in Economic Sciences, criticized The Limits to Growth (LTG) as having "simplistic" scenarios. He has also been a vocal critic of the Club of Rome. He has said that "the one thing that really annoys me is amateurs making absurd statements about economics, and I thought that the Club of Rome was nonsense. Not because natural resources or environmental necessities might not at some time pose a limit, not on growth, but on the level of economic activity—I didn't think that was a nonsensical idea—but because the Club of Rome was doing amateur dynamics without a license, without a proper qualification. And they were doing it badly, so I got steamed up about that." 

An analysis of the world model used for The Limits to Growth in 1976 by mathematicians Vermeulen and De Jongh has shown it to be "very sensitive to small parameter variations" and having "dubious assumptions and approximations".

An interdisciplinary team at Sussex University's Science Policy Research Unit reviewed the structure and assumptions of the models used and published its finding in Models of Doom; showing that the forecasts of the world's future are very sensitive to a few unduly pessimistic key assumptions. The Sussex scientists also claim that the Dennis Meadows et al. methods, data, and predictions are faulty, that their world models (and their Malthusian bias) do not accurately reflect reality.

Thomas Sowell in his 1995 book The Vision of the Anointed writes that corporationist Ken Galbraith was amongst other things a notable "teflon prophet" alongside American biologist Paul R. Ehrlich, the Club of Rome and Worldwatch Institute; they were utterly certain in their predictions, yet completely disproven empirically, though their reputations remained perfectly undamaged. With this collection of the "anointed", as promoters of a worldview concocted out of fantasy impervious to any real-world considerations.

The Club of Rome garnered "serious criticism" in 2016 after promoting the idea of a one-child policy for industrialized countries, in its pamphlet titled "Reinventing Prosperity". With PhD Reiner Klingholz, stating of the Club's pamphlet, "this is pure nonsense", as acting chairman of the Berlin Institute for Population and Development, an institute focused on sustainable development, citing the stable replacement rate of 2.1 not being met in Europe, at that time standing "already as low as 1.5".

Support
In contrast, John Scales Avery, a member of Nobel Peace Prize (1995) winning group associated with the Pugwash Conferences on Science and World Affairs, supported the basic thesis of The Limits to Growth by stating, "Although the specific predictions of resource availability in [The] Limits to Growth lacked accuracy, its basic thesis that unlimited economic growth on a finite planet is impossible was indisputably correct."

Notable members
 Alexander King (1909–2007), President of the Club of Rome 1984–1990, founding member
 Anders Wijkman, co-president, 2012–2018
 Ashok Khosla, co-president, 2006–2012
 Aurelio Peccei (1908–1984) founding member
 Bas de Leeuw
 Bohdan Hawrylyshyn (1926–2016) – economist, chairman International Management Institute – Kyiv, Honorary Council of Ukraine
 Călin Georgescu (born 1962) – chairman of the board, European Support Centre for the Club of Rome, now European Research Center, Vienna and Konstanz (2010–)
 Daisaku Ikeda 
 David Korten
 Dennis Meadows (born 1942)
 Dennis Gabor (1900)
 Derrick de Kerckhove (born 1944), Director of the McLuhan Program in Culture and Technology (University of Toronto) 1983–2008
 Dzhermen Gvishiani, son in law of Alexei Kosygin
 Eberhard von Koerber, co-president, 2006–2012
 Elisabeth Mann-Borgese – first female member since 1970
 Erich Jantsch, author of Technological Forecasting (1929–1980)
 Ernst Ulrich von Weizsäcker, co-president, 2012–2018
Fernando Henrique Cardoso
 Fredrick Chien (born in 1935), former Minister of Foreign Affairs of the Republic of China (Taiwan)
 Frederic Vester (1925–2003)
 Graeme Maxton
 Hans-Peter Dürr (1929–2014)
 Hugo Thiemann (1917–2012)
 Ivo Šlaus
 John R. Platt (1918–1992)
 Joseph Stiglitz (born 1943), Nobel prize-winning economist
 Jørgen Randers (born 1945), BI Norwegian Business School - Counsil for Astra Zeneca UK
 Kristín Vala Ragnarsdóttir 
 Mahdi Elmandjra (1933–2014)
 Mamphela Ramphele, co-president since 2018
 Max Kohnstamm, former Secretary General of the ECSC (1914–2010)
 Michael K. Dorsey 
 Mikhail Gorbachev (1931–2022), last leader of the Soviet Union
 Mihajlo D. Mesarovic
 Mohan Munasinghe
 Mugur Isărescu (born in 1949), the governor of the National Bank of Romania in Bucharest
 Nicholas Georgescu-Roegen (1906–1994), economist, author of The Entropy Law and the Economic Process
 Pierre Elliott Trudeau (1919–2000), former prime minister of Canada;
 Prince Hassan bin Talal, President of the Club of Rome 2000–2006
 Ricardo Díez Hochleitner, President, 1991–2000
 Robert Uffen (1923–2009), Chief Scientific Advisor to the Canadian government 1969–1971
 Sandrine Dixson-Declève, co-president since 2018
 Tomas Björkman, author of The World We Create 
 Václav Havel (1936–2011), last president of Czechoslovakia, first president of the Czech Republic
 Victor Urquidi (1919–2014)
 Mauricio de María y Campos (1943–2021)

See also 

 Club of Budapest
 Club of Madrid
 Club of Vienna
 Futures studies
 Global catastrophic risk
 Harlan Cleveland – DIKW
 Latin American World Model
 Olduvai Theory
 Peak oil
 Survivalism
 Doomer
 Ecofascism
 The Revenge of Gaia
 The First Global Revolution
 Pergamon Press

References

External links
 Last Call, documentary about The Limits to Growth (trailer)
 Club of Rome Reports and Bifurcations, a 40-year overview 17 March 2010 / Draft
 Analysis of Limits to Growth by Australian Broadcasting Corporation from 1999
 Donella Meadows Institute
 Suter, K. (1999). "The Club of Rome: The Global Conscience". Contemporary Review, 275 (1602), pp. 1–5

1968 establishments in Italy
Think tanks established in 1968
20th century in Rome
Futures studies organizations
Globalism
Oceanography
Political and economic think tanks based in Europe
International sustainability organizations
Systems thinking
Think tanks based in Italy
Winterthur
Organisations based in Switzerland